David Freidel (born 1946) is a U.S. archaeologist who studies the ancient Maya. He is known for his research at El Perú-Waka’ and his books with epigrapher Linda Schele. He is currently a professor at Washington University in St. Louis.

He received his B.A. from Harvard University with a senior honors thesis "Comparative analysis of the Mesolithic and prepottery Neolithic cultures of Palestine" and a Ph.D. from Harvard University in 1976 for a thesis "Late postclassic settlement patterns on Cozumel Island, Quintana Roo, Mexico "

He is the author of (partial bibliography):
 Freidel, David A., Linda Schele, and Joy Parker. Maya Cosmos: Three Thousand Years on the Shaman's Path. New York: HarperCollins Publishers, 2001. ISBN  (present in 684 WorldCat libraries )
 Spanish translation: Freidel, David A., MacDuff Everton, Justin Kerr, Joy Parker, and Linda Schele. El cosmos maya: tres mil años por la senda de los chamanes. México, D.F.: Fondo de Cultura Económica, 2000. 
 Freidel, David, and Barbara Macleod (2000). "Creation Redux: new thoughts on Maya cosmology from epigraphy, iconography, and archaeology". PARI Journal 1(2):1–8, 18.
 Freidel, David A., and Marilyn A. Masson. Ancient Maya Political Economies. Walnut Creek, Calif: AltaMira Press, 2002.,  ( present in 295 WorldCat libraries ) 
 Freidel, David A., and Robin A. Robertson. Archaeology at Cerros, Belize, Central America. (3 v.) Dallas, Tex: Southern Methodist University Press, 1986. 
 Freidel, David A., Arlen F. Chase, Anne S. Dowd, and Jerry Murdock. Maya E Groups: Calendars, Astronomy, and Urbanism in the Early Lowlands. University Press of Florida 2018. <https://doi.org/10.5744/florida/9780813054353.001.0001>.
 Freidel, David A., and Jeremy A. Sabloff. Cozumel: Late Maya Settlement Patterns. Orlando: Academic, 1984.  9780122669804
Freidel, David A. and Linda Schele. Forest of Kings – the Untold Story of the Ancient Maya. HarperCollins 1992. 9780688112042

References

1946 births
Living people
Washington University in St. Louis faculty
Harvard College alumni